Do Saal Ki Aurat (lit:Woman of 2 years), is a Pakistani television drama series that was first aired on 1 October 2014. It ended on 11 December 2014. It is directed by Chaudhary Ali Hassan and written by Amir Raza.

Cast 
 Samiya Mumtaz as Hajra
 Umair Rana
 Noor ul Hassan
 Nayyer Ejaz
 Ali Tahir
 Farah Shah
 Munazzah Arif as Faria
 Nirvaan Nadeem as Raheel
 Hanzala Shahid
 Muhammad Sadoon
 Bonita Malik

References

External links 
 Official Website

2014 Pakistani television series debuts
2014 Pakistani television series endings
Pakistani drama television series